Luvale (also spelt Chiluvale, Lovale, Lubale, Luena, Lwena) is a Bantu language spoken by the Lovale people of Angola and Zambia. It is recognized as a regional language for educational and administrative purposes in Zambia, where about 168,000 people speak it as of 2006. Luvale uses a modified form of the latin alphabet in its written form.

Luvale is closely related to Chokwe.

Vocabulary
It contains many loanwords from Portuguese from colonial contact during 20th century, such as:

Phonology

Consonants

Vowels

Speakers
 Bernard K. Mbenga
 Samba Yonga
 Mokoomba

References

Further reading

External links

Moses C.B. Mulongesa, Vishimo vya Kuuko, Lubuto Library Special Collections, accessed May 3, 2014.
Luvale language books, Lubuto Library Special Collections
OLAC resources in and about the Luvale language

Chokwe-Luchazi languages
Languages of Angola
Languages of Zambia
Library of Congress Africa Collection related